Marzyeh Ghassemi is a Canada-based researcher in the field of computational medicine, where her research focuses on developing machine-learning algorithms to inform health-care decisions. She is currently an assistant professor at the University of Toronto's Department of Computer Science and Faculty of Medicine, and is a Canada CIFAR Artificial Intelligence (AI) chair and Canada Research Chair (Tier Two) in machine learning for health.

Research career 
Ghassemi pursued a bachelors of science degree in computer science and electrical engineering at New Mexico State University, a master's degree in biomedical engineering from Oxford University, and a PhD at the Massachusetts Institute of Technology (MIT).

In 2012, Ghassemi was a member of the Sana AudioPulse team, who won the GSMA Mobile Health Challenge as a result of developing a mobile phone app to screen for hearing impairment remotely.

During her PhD, Ghassemi collaborated with doctors based within Beth Israel Deaconess Medical Center's intensive care unit and noted the extensive amount of clinical data available. She then developed machine-learning algorithms to take in diverse clinical inputs and predict risks and mortality, such as the length of the patient's stay within the hospital, and whether additional interventions (such as blood transfusions) are necessary. Ghassemi was also the lead PhD student in a study where accelerometer data collected from smart wearable devices to successfully detect differences between patients with muscle tension dysphonia (MTD) and those without MTD.

Upon completing her PhD, Ghassemi was affiliated with both Alphabet’s Verily (as a visiting researcher) and at MIT (as a part-time post-doctoral researcher in Peter Szolovits' Computer Science and Artificial Intelligence Lab).

Ghassemi then joined as an assistant professor at the University of Toronto in fall 2018, where she was co-appointed to the Department of Computer Science and the University of Toronto's Faculty of Medicine, making her the first joint hire in computational medicine for the university. Ghassemi's lab is titled the Machine Learning for Health (ML4H) lab.

Ghassemi is a faculty member at the Vector Institute. She currently holds the Canada CIFAR Artificial Intelligence (AI) Chair position. In June 2019, Ghassemi was appointed a Canada Research Chair (Tier Two) in machine learning for health. Ghassemi has been cited over 1900 times, and has an h-index and i-10 index of 23 and 36 respectively. She was named as one of the 35 Innovators Under 35, in the visionaries category, in MIT Technology Reviews annual list.

Selected bibliography 

 The Disparate Impacts of Medical and Mental Health with AI. Chen, I., Szolovits, P., and Ghassemi, M. AMA Journals of Ethics. 2019;21(2):E167-179.
Predicting early psychiatric readmission with natural language processing of narrative discharge summaries. Anna Rumshisky, Marzyeh Ghassemi, Tristan Naumann, Peter Szolovits, Victor Castro, Thomas McCoy and Roy Perlis. Translational Psychiatry (2016).
Understanding vasopressor intervention and weaning: Risk prediction in a public heterogeneous clinical time series database. Marzyeh Ghassemi*, Mike Wu*, Mengling Feng, Leo A. Celi, Peter Szolovits, and Finale Doshi-Velez. Journal of the American Medical Informatics Association (JAMIA) 2016.
Using ambulatory voice monitoring to investigate common voice disorders: Research update. Daryush Mehta, Jarrad H. Van Stan, Matias Zañartu, Marzyeh Ghassemi, et al. Frontiers in Bioengineering and Biotechnology. 2015.
Leveraging a critical care database: SSRI use prior to ICU admission is associated with increased hospital mortality. Marzyeh Ghassemi, John Marshall, Nakul Singh, David J. Stone, and Leo A. Celi. Chest (journal). 2013.

References 

Year of birth missing (living people)
Living people
Alumni of the University of Oxford
Canadian women computer scientists
Canadian computer scientists
Canadian women engineers
Canadian biomedical engineers
Canadian electrical engineers
Canadian medical researchers
Academic staff of the University of Toronto
MIT School of Engineering alumni
New Mexico State University alumni